Charminar is a 2018 Indian Malayalam-language crime drama film written and directed by Ajith C. Logesh and produced by Sharmi Sirajudheen. The film stars Ashwin Kumar and Hemanth Menon along with Harshika Poonacha.

Plot 
It's a love story set in the world of fashion and advertisement industry. The story starts with Sethu who is calling his friend Anand for his confession before his suicide. Anand was an ad filmmaker and Sethu is a fashion designer, by Sethu, Nanda also became part of ad films and pursues a great career. Sethu loves Nanda but later Nanda cheats Sethu by creating a fake story. later, Sethu calls Anand and tells him that he is going to kill Nanda and he is in hotel Charminar. Anand promises Sethu to be there in 20 minutes. When Anand comes out of the room it shows that he was in Nanda's room and he is her boyfriend. He is also in hotel Charminar. in the second half, they show that Sethu was cheated by Nanda according to Anand's plan. Anand bravely goes out of the room without being in sight of Sethu and Sethu misunderstood somebody else as Nanda's boyfriend. Sethu brings Nanda in gunpoint and Anand comes to the room. Anand was happy that Sethu misunderstood somebody else. Later, he puts Anand at gunpoint and reveals that when Nanda tried to escape, Sethu hit her and Nanda become unconscious. When Sethu calls Anand for informing this, Anand by mistake threw his phone in her room and Sethu knows that he is her boyfriend. Then Sethu and Anand fight, but unfortunately Nanda shoots Anand by mistake. Sethu mentally teases Nanda. When he leaves the room, Sethu hears the silenced gunshot and realises Nanda committed suicide. At the end, Sethu pays an employee and he bravely erases the evidence like fingerprint and cctv visual etc.. then Sethu leaves hotel Charminar.

Cast 

 Ashwin Kumar as Sethu 
 Hemanth Menon as Anand 
 Harshika Poonacha as Nanda
 Sirajudeen as william joy
 Guinness Manoj as hotel employee

Production 
Principal photography began on 3 October 2017 in Bengaluru, The main locations of the film were Bengaluru, Madurai and Kochi.

Soundtrack

Release
The film was released on 9 March 2018 all over Kerala.

References

External links 
 

2010s Malayalam-language films
2018 crime drama films
Indian crime drama films